= Robert Gordon McKerron =

Robert Gordon McKerron FRCOG (1862–1937) was professor of midwifery at the University of Aberdeen from 1912 to 1936 and a foundation fellow of the Royal College of Obstetricians and Gynaecologists. He served with the Royal Army Medical Corps during the First World War when he was attached to the 1st Scottish General Hospital and achieved the rank of major.

His father was the parish minister of Auchindoir.

== Selected publications ==
- Pregnancy, Labour and Child-bed with Ovarian Tumour &c. Rebman, London, 1903. (Based on 1898 MD thesis)
